Jeff Moss (1942–1998) was creator of the Sesame Street television program.

Jeff Moss may also refer to:

 Jeff Moss (cricketer) (born 1947), Australian cricketer
 Jeff Moss (hacker) (born 1975), founder of the DEF CON and Black Hat technology conferences

See also
Geoffrey Moss (1885–1954), British soldier